Brison is a given name and a surname. Notable people with the name include:

Given name:
Brison D. Gooch (1925–2014), American historian, professor emeritus
Brison Manor (born 1952), American football defensive

Surname:
Bill Brison (born 1929), Anglican priest on both sides of the Atlantic
Derek Brison (born 1986), Aruban footballer
Jonathan Brison (born 1983), French professional footballer
Scott Brison PC MP (born 1967), Canadian politician from Nova Scotia
Susan Brison, Professor of Philosophy at Dartmouth College

See also
Brison-Saint-Innocent, commune in the Savoie department in the Rhône-Alpes region in France
Brisons, twin-peaked islet in the Atlantic situated 1 mile (1.6 km) offshore from Cape Cornwall in Cornwall, United Kingdom
Brisson (disambiguation)
Brizon (disambiguation)